The Munuscong River is a  river on the Upper Peninsula of Michigan in the United States. It is a tributary of Munuscong Lake, which is part of the St. Marys River waterway and an arm of Lake Huron.

See also
List of rivers of Michigan

References

Michigan  Streamflow Data from the USGS

Rivers of Michigan
Tributaries of Lake Huron